Elizabeth Maxwell Steele (c. 1733–1790) was an active supporter of the American Revolution. She helped run a prominent tavern in Salisbury, North Carolina that served as a "resort" for many notable figures of the time. Her involvement with the tavern allowed her to support the Revolution by offering hospitality and charity to other supporters of the American cause.



Early life and family
Steele was born in 1733 to a Scottish family, who had previously immigrated to Pennsylvania Province and later settled in Rowan County, Province of North Carolina. Steele first married Robert Gillespie, and had two children with him, Robert Jr. and Margaret Gillespie. Not much is known about Robert Gillespie Jr., and all that is known about Margaret Gillespie is that she married Samuel Eusebius McCorkle, who was a Presbyterian preacher and teacher. Robert Gillespie Sr. died in 1760, after being scalped by Cherokee Native Americans during a siege of Fort Dobbs.

After Robert Gillespie's death, Steele married her second husband William Steele, who was from Pennsylvania. They had one son together, John Steele. William Steele died before the Revolutionary War, which left Elizabeth Steele to raise three children and run an ordinary tavern in Salisbury single-handed. She also became involved in real estate speculation and was able to procure a small estate for herself.

John Steele, Elizabeth Steele's only child by her second husband William Steele (a merchant, innkeeper, and local real estate speculator), went on to become appointed comptroller of the U.S. Treasury by President Washington. He also played a major role in defending the militia concept and criticizing a standing army accompanied by excessive executive authority. There is also a book written about him called the Papers of John Steele.

Participation in the American Revolutionary War
Elizabeth Steele, who was a Whig Patriot, is most renowned for aiding General Nathanael Greene on the morning of February 2, 1781 from her tavern in Salisbury in Rowan County, North Carolina.

The encounter occurred at breakfast when a rather weary and disheartened General Greene entered the tavern. He had been riding all night and had just learned of the death of General William Davidson at the hands of the British Lieutenant, Colonel Banastre of the Tarleton's Dragoons. Davidson was killed defending Cowan's Ford on the Catwaba River, near present-day Davidson College, that also claimed the lives of 15–50 of his men in the Salisbury District Brigade. This was a blow to the war effort and put Greene in a difficult tactical position as he had been waiting the entire night for those men to launch a counter-attack on the British.

It quickly became clear to Steele that Greene was in need of aid. She gave him breakfast to help bolster his spirits. Once she learned of the general's current situation, she went into the back room of her tavern and, upon her return, drew from under her apron two small bags full of specie, probably the earnings of a number of years. General Greene accepted with thankfulness.

The words she imparted with the funds are inscribed in a memorial at Thyatira Presbyterian Church by the DAR. Quoted: "Elizabeth Maxwell Steel 1733–1791 -- Immortal Patriotism, By this gift she being dead yet speaketh. Salisbury - Feb. 1, 1781. To Nathaniel Greene in the darkest hour of his career, she gave 2 bags of gold and silver saying: "Take these, General, you need them & I can do without them." This, that this woman hath done, shall always be told as a memorial of her. Oct. 7, 1948. Erected by the E.M.S. Chapter DAR, Salisbury, N.C., descendants & other patriotic citizens."

After Greene's encounter with Steele, his circumstances improved greatly. While still in Salisbury, he garnered Mrs. Steele's aid, and he discovered a collection of more than 1,700 Continental arms that were stashed away for the militia. They were then put to use in resupplying the war effort against the British.

Legacy
Steele's helping of Greene proved to be immensely important to improving his spirits and morale, which would soon translate into success on the battlefield in skirmishes in the coming days and months, notably at the Battle of Guilford Courthouse in mid-March 1781. General Greene's biographer noted of his encounter with Steele: "Never, did relief come at a more propitious moment; nor would it be straining conjecture to suppose that he resumed his journey with his spirits cheered and lightened by this touching proof of woman's devotion to the cause of her country."

References 

1733 births
1790 deaths
People from Rowan County, North Carolina
North Carolina in the American Revolution
American people of Scottish descent
18th-century American businesspeople
18th-century American businesswomen
American women restaurateurs
American restaurateurs
Drinking establishment owners